Patty Fendick and Jill Hetherington won in the final 6–3, 6–3 against Belinda Cordwell and Julie Richardson.

Seeds
Champion seeds are indicated in bold text while text in italics indicates the round in which those seeds were eliminated. All eight seeded teams received byes into the second round.

Draw

Final

Top half

Bottom half

References
 1988 Fernleaf Classic Doubles Draw

Doubles
Doubles
Fern